Simon Paul Moutter is a New Zealand engineer and businessman, and was Managing Director of Spark New Zealand from 1 September 2012 to 30 June 2019.

Early life
Moutter grew up in Palmerston North, New Zealand,  He attended Highbury School, Monrad Intermediate and Palmerston North Boys High. He has a BSc Bachelor of Science (Physics) from Massey University, a BE (Hons) Bachelor of Engineering with Honours (Electrical and Electronics) from the University of Canterbury, and a ME Master of Engineering (Electrical and Electronics) also from the University of Canterbury.

Career
 1983–1987: Electrical Engineer, New Plymouth Power Station, Electricity Division, NZ Ministry of Energy
 1987–1990: MD and Founder of Electrotech Consultants Ltd, New Plymouth
 1991–1992: Station Manager, New Plymouth Power Station, Electricorp Production
 1992–1999: Chief Executive, Powerco
 1999–2000: General Manager Network Delivery, Telecom New Zealand
 2000–2002: Group General Manager Network & International, Telecom NZ
 2002–2006: Chief Operating Officer, Telecom NZ
 2006–2008: Chief Operating Officer (Business), Telecom NZ
 2008–2012: CEO, Auckland Airport 
 2009–2012: member of the New Zealand Racing Board
 2012–2019: CEO and Managing Director of Spark NZ
 2019–present: Operating Partner to Private equity firms in NZ and Australia

Awards
 1986 IPENZ Fulton-Downer Gold Medal
 1989 IPENZ Evan Parry Award
 2017 Deloitte Top200 NZ CEO of the Year

References

External links

Living people
Massey University alumni
University of Canterbury alumni
20th-century New Zealand engineers
21st-century New Zealand businesspeople
Year of birth missing (living people)
20th-century New Zealand businesspeople
21st-century New Zealand engineers
New Zealand electrical engineers